Shûtai Okamura (1877-1947) was a Japanese bryologist, noted for his identification of over 80 species.

Works

References

1877 births
1947 deaths
20th-century Japanese botanists